Endotricha rhodomicta is a species of snout moth in the genus Endotricha. It was described by George Hampson in 1916, and is known from New Guinea.

References

Moths described in 1916
Endotrichini